Kāpiti College is situated at Raumati Beach on the Kapiti Coast in New Zealand, 45 minutes drive from Wellington City.  It was called Raumati District High School when built in 1954, then renamed Kapiti College in 1957. The Kapiti College motto is "Semper Fidelis" which translates to "Always Faithful".

Numbers of students at the college increased by 400 in the 2003-2012 period.

Kāpiti College is a Decile 8 school, meaning the majority of its students are from above average socio-economic status.  Its students come from a wide range of backgrounds and includes a Māori proportion of 19 percent.

Facilities 
The latest addition to the school is Te Raukura ki Kāpiti, a new multi-million-dollar performing arts centre for use by the community and school which opened in February 2020. The facility was opened by Steven Joyce, former student.

Sports 
The College has a wide variety of sports teams at both Junior ( years 9-10 ) and Senior Level (11-13)

Arts 
The school has its own radio show on Wellington Access Radio.

Notable alumni 
Past students of Kāpiti College include All Blacks Mark Shaw and Christian Cullen, filmmaker Peter Jackson and Economic Development Minister Steven Joyce.

References

External links
 
 School Website

Educational institutions established in 1954
Secondary schools in the Wellington Region
Kapiti Coast District
Schools in the Kapiti Coast District
1954 establishments in New Zealand
Association of Community Access Broadcasters